Hoplostethus mento, more commonly known as the slimy head, is a member of the family Trachichthyidae. It is native to the Eastern Pacific from the Bay of Panama to Valparaiso, Chile. It can reach sizes of up to  TL.

References

External links
 

mento
Fish of Panama
Western South American coastal fauna
Fish described in 1899